The Almighty Johnsons is a New Zealand fantasy comedy/drama television series, which was created by James Griffin and Rachel Lang and was produced by South Pacific Pictures and aired from 7 February 2011 to 23 September 2013.

Production 
Funding for the first series was approved by NZ On Air in December 2009, a second series was approved in June 2011 and a third series was approved on 15 October 2012.

In December 2012, it was announced series three was in pre-production. Series 3 was the culmination of the search for Frigg.

Filming 
Series two began filming in October 2011 and concluded in February 2012.

Series three began filming on 14 January 2013 and concluded on 9 May 2013.

Initial cancellation and fan campaign 
On 6 September 2012, various members of the cast reported via Twitter that the show would not be renewed for a third season. This was confirmed by co-creator, James Griffin. Fan protests were launched immediately both in New Zealand and internationally, taking the form of an online petition, written complaints to TV3, and a 'send a twig to TV3' campaign (representing Yggdrasil, the mythical 'tree of life' from the show).

Second cancellation 
The show's cancellation was announced in December 2013 via radio announcement on Radio New Zealand by TV3 programming boss Mark Caulton.

Plot 
The show follows a student named Axl Johnson, who on his 21st birthday discovers he and his family members are reincarnated Norse gods, whose powers are somewhat muted in their human form. It is up to Axl, who is the reincarnation of Odin, to restore their full powers and ensure the family's survival by finding the reincarnation of Odin's wife, Frigg. Matters are complicated by the presence of three Norse goddesses who are trying to find Frigg before the Johnsons do to prevent the restoration of the gods' full powers (which would vault them above the goddesses), as well as an antagonistic reincarnation of Norse god Loki, and the appearance of a Māori deity pantheon toward the end of the second series.

Cast and characters

Johnson Family

Goddesses

Gods

Other Mythicals

Mortals

Series overview

Reception
Series 1 holds a "100% fresh" rating at Rotten Tomatoes, critics giving 8 out of 10 points, and 88% from audiences.

Awards and nominations

Aotearoa Film & Television Awards

New York Festivals

Rialto Channel New Zealand Film Awards

Sir Julius Vogel Award

SWANZ

Home video releases 

The first series of The Almighty Johnsons has been released in New Zealand, the United Kingdom, Australia and the United States. The second series has been released in New Zealand and the United Kingdom. The third series has been released in New Zealand, the United Kingdom, and the United States.  The complete series 1-3 box set was released in the United States on 28 April 2015.

Broadcast 
Series one premiered in Australia on Network Ten on 19 December 2011, airing at 10:30 p.m. on Mondays, and on Sci Fi Channel on 26 February 2012, airing at 6:30 p.m. on Sundays, in Canada on SPACE on 23 July 2012, airing at 9:00 p.m. on Mondays, and in the United Kingdom on Syfy on 2 February 2012, airing at 10:00 p.m. on Thursdays.

Series two premiered in Australia on Network Ten on 21 December 2012, airing at 9:30 p.m. on Fridays, and on SF on 22 March 2013, airing at 9:30 p.m. on Fridays, in Canada on SPACE on 14 January 2013, airing at 10:00 p.m. on Mondays, and in the United Kingdom on Syfy on 17 September 2012, airing at 10:00 p.m. on Mondays.

Series three premiered in Canada on SPACE on 4 July 2013, at 9:00 p.m., the same day as the New Zealand premiere, and in the United Kingdom on Syfy on 28 August 2013, airing at 10:00 p.m. on Wednesdays.

Series one began broadcasting in the United States on 11 July 2014 on Syfy, with series two set to follow. According to the review site Common Sense Media, the Syfy broadcasts are somewhat censored, with nudity blurred out.

In the Republic of Ireland the show airs on TG4.

The complete series was available on Netflix in some countries, including the United States, Canada, Australia.

The series can also be viewed in the UK on Amazon prime video.

As of January 2022 full series can be viewed on Tubi.

References

External links 
 
 Production website
 
 The Almighty Johnsons at South Pacific Pictures

2010s New Zealand television series
2011 New Zealand television series debuts
2013 New Zealand television series endings
English-language television shows
New Zealand comedy-drama television series
New Zealand fantasy television series
Television series based on multiple mythologies
Television series based on Norse mythology
Television series by All3Media
Television series by South Pacific Pictures
Television series revived after cancellation
Television shows filmed in New Zealand
Television shows funded by NZ on Air
Television shows set in Auckland
Three (TV channel) original programming